Hey You! is an Australian television sitcom which first screened on the 0-10 Network in 1967 and ran for 16 episodes.

Cast
 Colin McEwan as Ocker Ramsay
 Ernie Bourne as Major Hugh T. Worthington
 Margaret Reid as Mrs. Myrtle McNugg
 Sue Israel as Miss Farthingale
 George Whaley as Simpkins

See also
 List of Australian television series

References

External links
 
 Hey You! at Classic Television Australia

1967 Australian television series debuts
1967 Australian television series endings
Australian television sitcoms
Network 10 original programming
Black-and-white Australian television shows
English-language television shows